Pao brevirostris is a species of pufferfish in the family Tetraodontidae. It is a tropical freshwater species native to Asia, where it is known from the Mekong basin and the Chao Phraya drainage. It inhabits marshes and swamps with dense aquatic plant cover, and the species is known to frequently hide between roots and among submerged foliage. Males of the species reach 9.5 cm (3.7 inches) SL, with females reaching 7.7 cm (3 inches) SL. 

In captivity, the species has been reported to eat juvenile fish, with individuals involved in a study being fed on juveniles of the species Oreochromis niloticus, Barbonymus gonionotus, Henicorhynchus siamensis, and Hypophthalmichthys molitrix.

References 

Tetraodontidae
Fish of Asia
Fish described in 1957